Saxon Earley (born 11 October 2002) is an English professional footballer who plays for Plymouth Argyle, as a left-back and midfielder.

Career
Earley joined Norwich City at under-9 level, and turned professional in 2021, before signing a one-year extension in February 2022. He moved on loan to Stevenage in July 2022. He signed for Plymouth Argyle in January 2023, for an undisclosed fee.

References

2002 births
Living people
English footballers
Norwich City F.C. players
Stevenage F.C. players
Plymouth Argyle F.C. players
English Football League players
Association football fullbacks
Association football midfielders